The Landrücken Tunnel is a railway tunnel on the Hanover-Würzburg high-speed rail line. With a length of  it is the longest tunnel in Germany.

Geography 
The tunnel is in east Hessen between the stations of Fulda and Würzburg. Between the northern tunnel entrance of Kalbach (50° 24′ 22″N, 9° 39′3″E) and the southern end at Mottgers (50° 18′35″N, 9° 39′47″E) it crosses the Landrücken range which forms the Rhein-Weser drainage divide dividing the river basins of the Fulda and Main.

Description of tunnel 
The double-track Landrücken Tunnel was built using the New Austrian Tunnelling method working from the north portal, known as "Baulos Nord" and two side accesses ("Baulos Mitte" and "Baulos Süd"). In addition, three shafts were established for ventilation during tunnel boring.

It surpassed the Kaiser-Wilhelm-Tunnel near Cochem as the longest railway tunnel in Germany.

Outside the north portal of the tunnel, at 380m altitude is the summit of the Hanover-Würzburg high-speed rail line.

Technical data 
 length: 
 year of opening: 1988
 tracks: two
 track separation: 
 tunnel cross section area: 
 steepest gradient: 1.25% 
 speed limit: 
 equipment: Electrified, LZB signalling, "Zugfunk" radio, GSM-R, BOS-Funk, C-Netz (from 1992 to 2000), GSM900/1800 (T-mobile, Vodafone and Eplus since the middle of 2006), FM radio, wind direction measuring system, two emergency exits)

Accidents 

On April 26, 2008, ICE train 885 was on its way from Hamburg to Munich with 170 people on board.  At 9:05pm, it collided with a herd of sheep that had strayed into the tunnel. The train derailed at  inside the tunnel.  25 people were injured, 12 of the 14 cars were derailed.

Distelrasen-Tunnel 
A few kilometers west of the Landrücken Tunnel, the Distelrasen-Tunnel built in 1914, near Schlüchtern-Elm on the Kinzig Valley Railway, was the first railway to traverse the Landrücken drainage divide.

References

External links 

Buildings and structures in Hesse
High-speed rail in Germany
Railway tunnels in Germany
Transport in Hesse
Tunnels completed in 1988
East Hesse
Hanover–Würzburg high-speed railway